Zəylik is a village and municipality in the Dashkasan District of Azerbaijan. It has a population of 357. The village had an Armenian population before the exodus of Armenians from Azerbaijan after the outbreak of the Nagorno-Karabakh conflict. Many of the villagers settled in Pambak in Armenia.

References

External links 
 

Populated places in Dashkasan District